The Wyatt House is a historic house at Gainer Ferry Road and Arkansas Highway 25 in Desha, Arkansas.  It is a two-story I-house, three bays wide, with a side gable roof, end chimneys, and a single-story ell extending to the rear.  The oldest portion of the house, its first floor, was built about 1870 as a dogtrot.  In about 1900, the breezeway of the dogtrot was enclosed, and the second story and ell were added.  The property also includes a stone wellhouse dating to the enlargement.  The house was built by Samuel Wyatt, a veteran of the American Civil War.

The house was listed on the National Register of Historic Places in 1999.

See also
National Register of Historic Places listings in Independence County, Arkansas

References

Houses on the National Register of Historic Places in Arkansas
Houses completed in 1870
Houses in Independence County, Arkansas
National Register of Historic Places in Independence County, Arkansas
1870 establishments in Arkansas
Dogtrot architecture in Arkansas
I-houses in Arkansas